Dipodoidea is a superfamily of rodents, also known as dipodoids, found across the Northern Hemisphere. This superfamily includes over 50 species among the 16 genera in 3 families. They include the jerboas (family Dipodidae), jumping mice (family Zapodidae), and birch mice (family Sminthidae). Different species are found in grassland, deserts, and forests. They are all capable of saltation (jumping while in a bipedal stance), a feature that is most highly evolved in the desert-dwelling jerboas.

Taxonomy 
Formerly, Dipodoidea contained only a single large family, Dipodidae, which contained jerboas, jumping mice, and birch mice as subfamilies. However, phylogenetic evidence found all three to be distinct families from one another, and thus they were split into three different families within Dipodoidea.

Characteristics 
They are all adapted for jumping, although to varying degrees. The jerboas have very long hind legs which, in most species, include cannon bones. They move either by jumping, or by walking on their hind legs. The jumping mice have long feet, but lack the extreme adaptations of the jerboas, so that they move by crawling or making short hops, rather than long leaps. Both jerboas and jumping mice have long tails to aid their balance. Birch mice have shorter tails and feet, but they, too, move by jumping.

Most dipodoids are omnivorous, with a diet consisting of seeds and insects. Some species of jerboa, however, such as Allactaga sibirica, are almost entirely insectivorous. Like other rodents, they have gnawing incisors separated from the grinding cheek teeth by a gap, or diastema. The dental formula for dipodids is:

Jerboas and birch mice make their nests in burrows, which, in the case of jerboas, may be complex, with side-chambers for storage of food. In contrast, while jumping mice sometimes co-opt the burrows of other species, they do not dig their own, and generally nest in thick vegetation. Most species hibernate for at least half the year, surviving on fat that they build up in the weeks prior to going to sleep.

Dipodoids give birth to litters of between two and seven young after a gestation period of between 17 and 42 days. They breed once or twice a year, depending on the species.

Classification

Extant species 

Superfamily Dipodoidea

 Family Sminthidae
 Genus Sicista, birch mice
 Armenian birch mouse Sicista armenica
 Northern birch mouse, Sicista betulina
 Caucasian birch mouse, Sicista caucasica
 Long-tailed birch mouse, Sicista caudata
 Tsimlyansk birch mouse, Sicista cimlanica
 Chinese birch mouse, Sicista concolor
 Kazbeg birch mouse, Sicista kazbegica
 Kluchor birch mouse, Sicista kluchorica
 Nordmann's birch mouse, Sicistica loriger
 Altai birch mouse, Sicista napaea
 Gray birch mouse, Sicista pseudonapaea
 Severtzov's birch mouse, Sicista severtzovi
 Strand's birch mouse, Sicista strandi
 Southern birch mouse, Sicista subtilis
 Talgar birch mouse, Sicista talgarica
 Terskey birch mouse, Sicista terskeica
 Tien Shan birch mouse, Sicista tianshanica
 Hungarian birch mouse, Sicista trizona
 Zhetysu birch mouse, Sicista zhetysuica
 Family Zapodidae, jumping mice
 Genus Eozapus
 Chinese jumping mouse, Eozapus setchuanus
 Genus Napaeozapus
 Western woodland jumping mouse, Napaeozapus abietorum
 Eastern woodland jumping mouse, Napaeozapus insignis
 Genus Zapus
 Northern meadow jumping mouse, Zapus hudsonius
 Southern meadow jumping mouse, Zapus luteus
 Central Pacific jumping mouse, Zapus montanus
 Oregon jumping mouse, Zapus oregonus
 South Pacific jumping mouse, Zapus pacificus
 Southwestern jumping mouse, Zapus princeps
 Northwestern jumping mouse, Zapus saltator
 North Pacific jumping mouse, Zapus trinotatus
 Family Dipodidae, jerboas
 Subfamily Allactaginae
 Genus Allactaga
 Subgenus Allactaga
 Small five-toed jerboa, Allactaga elater
 Iranian jerboa, Allactaga firouzi
 Hotson's jerboa, Allactaga hotsoni
 Great jerboa, Allactaga major
 Severtzov's jerboa, Allactaga severtzovi
 Vinogradov's jerboa, Allactaga vinogradovi
 Subgenus Orientallactaga
 Balikun jerboa, Allactaga balikunica
 Gobi jerboa, Allactaga bullata
 Mongolian five-toed jerboa, Allactaga sibirica
 Subgenus Paralactaga
 Euphrates jerboa, Allactaga euphratica
 Williams' jerboa, Allactaga williamsi
 Subgenus Scarturus
 Four-toed jerboa, Allactaga tetradactyla
 incertae sedis
 Allactaga toussi
 Genus Allactodipus
 Bobrinski's jerboa, Allactodipus bobrinskii
 Genus Pygeretmus, fat-tailed jerboas
 Lesser fat-tailed jerboa, Pygeretmus platyurus
 Dwarf fat-tailed jerboa, Pygeretmus pumilio
 Greater fat-tailed jerboa, Pygeretmus shitkovi
 Subfamily Cardiocraniinae
 Genus Cardiocranius
 Five-toed pygmy jerboa, Cardiocranius paradoxus
 Genus Salpingotulus
 Baluchistan pygmy jerboa, Salpingotulus michaelis
 Genus Salpingotus, pygmy jerboas
 Subgenus Anguistodontus
 Thick-tailed pygmy jerboa, Salpingotus crassicauda
 Subgenus Prosalpingotus
 Heptner's pygmy jerboa, Salpingotus heptneri
 Pale pygmy jerboa, Salpingotus pallidus
 Thomas's pygmy jerboa, Salpingotus thomasi
 Subgenus Salpingotus
 Kozlov's pygmy jerboa, Salpingotus kozlovi
 Subfamily Dipodinae
 Tribe Dipodini
 Genus Dipus
 Northern three-toed jerboa, Dipus sagitta
 Genus Eremodipus
 Lichtenstein's jerboa, Eremodipus lichtensteini
 Genus Jaculus
 Blanford's jerboa, Jaculus blanfordi
 Lesser Egyptian jerboa, Jaculus jaculus
 Greater Egyptian jerboa, Jaculus orientalis
 Thaler's jerboa, Jaculus thaleri
 Genus Stylodipus, three-toed jerboas
 Andrews's three-toed jerboa, Stylodipus andrewsi
 Mongolian three-toed jerboa, Stylodipus sungorus
 Thick-tailed three-toed jerboa, Stylodipus telum
 Tribe Paradipodini
 Genus Paradipus
 Comb-toed jerboa, Paradipus ctenodactylus
 Subfamily Euchoreutinae
 Genus Euchoreutes, long-eared jerboa
 Long-eared jerboa, Euchoreutes naso

Fossil genera 
Dipodoidea has a well-documented fossil record dating back to the Eocene. These fossil species are definitively known:

 Genus †Aksyiromys
 Genus †Elymys
 Genus †Primisminthus
 Family †Simimyidae
 Genus †Simimys 
 Genus †Simiacritomys

Primisminthus from the middle Eocene of China could be the oldest member of the group, while Banyuesminthus, also from the middle Eocene of China, could represent a sister group to the rest of the Dipodoidea.

References 

 

Dipodoid rodents
Rodent taxonomy
Mammal superfamilies
Extant Eocene first appearances
Taxa named by Gotthelf Fischer von Waldheim